Paolo Emilio Sammarco (died 1610) was a Roman Catholic prelate who served as Bishop of Umbriatico (1609–1610).

Biography
Paolo Emilio Sammarco was born in Rossano, Italy and ordained a priest in 1576.
On 16 February 1609, he was appointed during the papacy of Pope Paul V as Bishop of Umbriatico.
On 24 February 1609, he was consecrated bishop by Giovanni Garzia Mellini, Bishop of Imola, with Antonio d'Aquino, Bishop of Sarno, and Gaspare Paluzzi degli Albertoni, Bishop of Sant'Angelo dei Lombardi e Bisaccia, serving as co-consecrators.
He served as Bishop of Umbriatico until his death in 1610.

References

External links and additional sources
 (for Chronology of Bishops) 
 (for Chronology of Bishops) 

17th-century Italian Roman Catholic bishops
Bishops appointed by Pope Paul V
1610 deaths